University of Dir is a public university located in Lower Dir District, Khyber Pakhtunkhwa, Pakistan. The university was founded on 23 November 2021. It was a campus named Timergara Campus of Abdul Wali Khan University Mardan.

References

Public universities and colleges in Khyber Pakhtunkhwa
Educational institutions established in 2021
2021 establishments in Pakistan
Lower Dir District